Samson (Italian:Sansone) is a 1923 Italian silent drama film directed by Torello Rolli and starring Angelo Ferrari and Elena Sangro. It is an adaptation of the 1908 play of the same title by Henri Bernstein. A woman from a poor aristocratic family is pressured by her relatives to marry a wealthy businessman, although she doesn't love him.

Cast
 Gemma De Ferrari 
 Angelo Ferrari as Jack Brachart  
 Franco Gennaro as Andeline  
 Giuseppe Pierozzi 
 Elena Sangro as Anne-Marie d'Andeline  
 Enrico Scatizzi as La Govain

References

Bibliography
 Goble, Alan.  The Complete Index to Literary Sources in Film. Walter de Gruyter, 1999.

External links 
 

1923 films
1923 drama films
Italian drama films
Italian silent feature films
1920s Italian-language films
Italian films based on plays
Italian black-and-white films
Silent drama films
1920s Italian films